Bethlehem Armory also known as Floyd Simons Armory, is a historic National Guard armory located in Bethlehem in Lehigh County, Pennsylvania.  It was built in 1930, and is an "I"-plan brick building in three sections.  It consists of a two-story administration building, drill hall, and kitchen / locker room executed in the Art Deco style. It measures , and has a hipped roof. Additions were built in 1938 and 1968.

It was added to the National Register of Historic Places in 1991.

Gallery

References

Armories on the National Register of Historic Places in Pennsylvania
Art Deco architecture in Pennsylvania
Infrastructure completed in 1930
Buildings and structures in Lehigh County, Pennsylvania
National Register of Historic Places in Lehigh County, Pennsylvania